Mariani Assembly constituency is one of the 126 assembly constituencies of Assam Legislative Assembly. Mariani forms part of the Jorhat Lok Sabha constituency.

Members of Legislative Assembly 
 1967: Gajen Tanti, Indian National Congress
 1972: Gajen Tanti, Indian National Congress
 1978: Gajen Tanti, Indian National Congress
 1983: Siba Buragohain, Indian National Congress
 1985: Naren Tanti, Independent
 1991: Rupam Kurmi, Indian National Congress
 1996: Rupam Kurmi, Indian National Congress
 2001: Rupam Kurmi, Indian National Congress
 2004 (by-polls): Alok Kumar Ghosh, All India Trinamool Congress
 2006: Rupjyoti Kurmi, Indian National Congress
 2011: Rupjyoti Kurmi, Indian National Congress
 2016: Rupjyoti Kurmi, Indian National Congress
 2021: Rupjyoti Kurmi, Indian National Congress
 2021 (by-polls): Rupjyoti Kurmi, Bharatiya Janata Party

Election results

2021 by-poll

2021 result

2016 result

2011 result

1972 result

External links 
 

Jorhat district
Assembly constituencies of Assam